Mike Fright is a 1934 Our Gang short comedy film directed by Gus Meins.  It was the (42nd talking episode) 130th Our Gang short that was released.

Plot
When open auditions are announced for a radio variety program, the local station is besieged by aggressively over-coached "professional kids." Also auditioning is the International Silver String Submarine Band—which turns out to be the gang, equipped (or rather, armed) with home-made instruments.

They suffer through an endless parade of cute kiddie troupers, and accidentally knock over the microphone several times, which inadvertently blows tubes and bulbs in the control room, causing the hat worn by the sound man, played by vaudevillian Sid Walker, to be literally blown off his head, and making his hair stand on end. The gang then steal the show with a rendition of "The Daring Young Man on the Flying Trapeze."

Musical numbers include Jimmy had a Nickel (by Maurice Sigler), My Little Grass Shack in Kealakekua, Hawaii, and My Wild Irish Rose (by Chauncey Olcott), which is cut short because the gang is distractingly eating lemons!

Cast

The Gang
 Matthew Beard as Stymie (on percussion)
 Scotty Beckett as Scotty (on fife)
 Tommy Bond as Tommy (conducting)
 George McFarland as Spanky (on kazoo)
 Alvin Buckelew as Alvin (on harmonica)
 Jackie Wilson as Jackie (on ukulele)
 Pete the Pup as himself

Additional cast
 Leonard Kibrick as Leonard
 Jean Aulbach as Hula dancer
 Billy Lee as Tap dancer
 Leona McDowell as Darling Sister
 Joy Wurgaft as Hula dancer
 Sid Walker as Charlie, the Sound Man
 Charlie Hall as Elevator Operator
 Marvin Hatley as Piano Player
 William Irving as Announcer
 Frank LaRue as Mr. Barker, the Sponsor 
 Isabel La Mal as Receptionist
 James C. Morton as Mr. Morton, Station Manager
 Fern Carter as Audience member
 Joe Young as Audience member
 Laura June Kenny as Undetermined role
 Gloria White as Undetermined role
 The Meglin Kiddies as Dancers

Theme song

Mike Fright was the first Our Gang short since Pups Is Pups to not contain the opening "Good Old Days" Our Gang theme song. Instead, it was replaced with the Leroy Shield incidental tune "Little Dancing Girl", which appeared as background music in many of the films and would be the music used for the first 4 minutes of this episode. Because the nature of this film was a talent show with a variety of musical selections, additional background music was not used, nor was it needed.

See also
 Our Gang filmography

References

External links
 
 

Films directed by Gus Meins
Hal Roach Studios short films
Our Gang films
1934 films
1934 comedy films
American black-and-white films
1934 short films
1930s American films